Stray Bullet may refer to:

 Stray bullet, a bullet that hits an unintended target
 Stray Bullet (1960 Korean film), a film by Yu Hyun-mok and based on Yi Beomseon's novella Obaltan
 Stray Bullet (2010 film), a 2010 Lebanese film by Georges Hachem
 Stray Bullet Games, an American video game development company founded in 2006
 "Stray Bullet", a song by Bruce Springsteen on the 2015 album The Ties That Bind: The River Collection
 "Stray Bullet", a 1997 song by KMFDM from Symbols
 "Stray Bullet", a 1994 song by Organized Konfusion from Stress: The Extinction Agenda
 "Nagaredama", literally "Stray Bullet", a 2021 single by Japanese female idol group Sakurazaka46
 An episode of The Powerpuff Girls.

See also
 Stray Bullets (disambiguation)